James Weldon Johnson (June 17, 1871June 26, 1938) was an American writer and civil rights activist. He was married to civil rights activist Grace Nail Johnson. Johnson was a leader of the National Association for the Advancement of Colored People (NAACP), where he started working in 1917. In 1920, he was chosen as executive secretary of the organization, effectively the operating officer. He served in that position from 1920 to 1930. Johnson established his reputation as a writer, and was known during the Harlem Renaissance for his poems, novel, and anthologies collecting both poems and spirituals of black culture. He wrote the lyrics for "Lift Every Voice and Sing", which later became known as the Negro National Anthem, the music being written by his younger brother, composer J. Rosamond Johnson.

Johnson was appointed under President Theodore Roosevelt as U.S. consul in Venezuela and Nicaragua for most of the period from 1906 to 1913. In 1934, he was the first African American professor to be hired at New York University. Later in life, he was a professor of creative literature and writing at Fisk University, a historically black university.

Life
Johnson was born in 1871 in Jacksonville, Florida, the son of Helen Louise Dillet, a native of Nassau, Bahamas, and James Johnson. His maternal great-grandmother, Hester Argo, had escaped from Saint-Domingue (today Haiti) during the revolutionary upheaval in 1802, along with her three young children, including James's grandfather Stephen Dillet (1797–1880). Although originally headed to Cuba, their boat was intercepted by privateers and they were taken to Nassau, where they permanently settled. In 1833, Stephen Dillet became the first man of color to win election to the Bahamian legislature.

James's brother John Rosamond Johnson became a composer. The boys were first educated by their mother, a musician and a public-school teacher, before attending Edwin Stanton School to his studies for the bachelor's degree, he also completed some graduate coursework.

The achievement of his father, a preacher, and the headwaiter at the St. James Hotel, a luxury establishment built when Jacksonville was one of Florida's first winter resort destinations, inspired young James to pursue a professional career. Molded by the classical education for which Atlanta University was known, Johnson regarded his academic training as a trust. He knew he was expected to devote himself to helping black people advance. Johnson was a prominent member of Phi Beta Sigma fraternity.

Johnson and his brother Rosamond moved to New York City as young men, joining the Great Migration out of the South in the first half of the 20th century. They collaborated on songwriting and achieved some success on Broadway in the early 1900s. Over the next 40 years, Johnson served in several public capacities, working in education, the diplomatic corps, and civil rights activism. In 1904, he participated in Theodore Roosevelt's successful presidential campaign. After becoming president, Roosevelt appointed Johnson as United States consul at Puerto Cabello, Venezuela, where he served from 1906 to 1908, and then to Nicaragua, where he served from 1909 to 1913.

In 1910, Johnson married Grace Nail, whom he had met in New York City several years earlier while he was working as a songwriter. A cultured and well-educated New Yorker, Grace Nail Johnson later collaborated with her husband on a screenwriting project. After their return to New York from Nicaragua, Johnson became increasingly involved in the Harlem Renaissance, a great flourishing of art and writing. He wrote his own poetry and supported work by others, also compiling and publishing anthologies of spirituals and poetry. Owing to his influence and his innovative poetry, Johnson became a leading voice in the Harlem Renaissance of the 1920s.

Civil rights activism
He became involved in civil rights activism, especially the campaign to pass the federal Dyer Anti-Lynching Bill, as Southern states did not prosecute perpetrators. He was a speaker at the 1919 National Conference on Lynching. Starting as a field secretary for the NAACP in 1917, Johnson rose to become one of the most successful officials in the organization. He traveled to Memphis, Tennessee, for example, to investigate a brutal lynching that was witnessed by thousands. His report on the carnival-like atmosphere surrounding the burning-to-death of Ell Persons was published nationally as a supplement to the July 1917 issue of the NAACP's Crisis magazine, and during his visit there he chartered the Memphis chapter of the NAACP. His 1920 report about "the economic corruption, forced labor, press censorship, racial segregation, and wanton violence introduced to Haiti by the U.S. occupation encouraged numerous African Americans to flood the State Department and the offices of Republican Party officials with letters" calling for an end to the abuses and to remove troops. The United States finally ended its occupation of Haiti in 1934, 16 years after the threat of Germany in the area had been ended by its defeat in the First World War.

Appointed in 1920 as the first executive secretary of the NAACP, Johnson helped increase membership and extended the movement's reach by organizing numerous new chapters in the South. During this period, the NAACP was mounting frequent legal challenges to the Southern states' disenfranchisement of African Americans, which had been established at the turn of the century by such legal devices as poll taxes, literacy tests, and white primaries.

While attending Atlanta University, Johnson became known as an influential campus speaker. In 1892, he won the Quiz Club Contest in English Composition and Oratory. He founded and edited the Daily American newspaper in 1895. At a time when Southern legislatures were passing laws and constitutions that disenfranchised blacks and Jim Crow laws to impose racial segregation, the newspaper covered both political and racial topics. It was terminated a year later due to financial difficulty. These early endeavors were the start of Johnson's long period of activism.

In 1904, he accepted a position as the treasurer of the Colored Republican Club, started by Charles W. Anderson. A year later he was elected as president of the club. He organized political rallies. During 1914, Johnson became editor of the editorial page of the New York Age, an influential African-American weekly newspaper based in New York City. In the early 20th century, it had supported Booker T. Washington's position for racial advancement by industrious work within the racial community, against the arguments of W. E. B. Du Bois for development of a "talented tenth" and political activism to challenge white supremacy. Johnson's writing for the Age displayed the political gift that soon made him famous.

In 1916, Johnson started working as a field secretary and organizer for the National Association for the Advancement of Colored People (NAACP), which had been founded in 1910. In this role, he built and revived local chapters. Opposing race riots in Northern cities and the lynchings frequent in the South during and immediately after the end of World War I, Johnson engaged the NAACP in mass demonstrations. He organized a silent protest parade of more than 10,000 African Americans down New York City's Fifth Avenue on July 28, 1917, to protest the still frequent lynchings of blacks in the South.

Social tensions erupted after veterans returned from the First World War, and tried to find work. In 1919, Johnson coined the term "Red Summer" and organized peaceful protests against the white racial violence against blacks that broke out that year in numerous industrial cities of the North and Midwest. There was fierce competition for housing and jobs.

Johnson traveled to Haiti to investigate conditions on the island, which had been occupied by U.S. Marines since 1915, ostensibly because of political unrest. As a result of this trip, Johnson published a series of articles in The Nation in 1920 in which he described the American occupation as brutal. He offered suggestions for the economic and social development of Haiti. These articles were later collected and reprinted as a book under the title Self-Determining Haiti.

In 1920, Johnson was chosen as the first black executive secretary of the NAACP, effectively the operating officer position. He served in this role through 1930. He lobbied for the Dyer Anti-Lynching Bill of 1921, which was passed easily by the House, but repeatedly defeated by the white Southern bloc in the Senate.

Throughout the 1920s, Johnson supported and promoted the Harlem Renaissance, trying to help young black authors to get published. Shortly before his death in 1938, Johnson supported efforts by Ignatz Waghalter, a Polish-Jewish composer who had escaped the Nazis of Germany, to establish a classical orchestra of African-American musicians.

Education and law careers
In the summer of 1891, following his freshman year at Atlanta University, Johnson went to a rural district in Georgia to teach the descendants of former slaves. "In all of my experience there has been no period so brief that has meant so much in my education for life as the three months I spent in the backwoods of Georgia," Johnson wrote. "I was thrown for the first time on my own resources and abilities." Johnson graduated from Atlanta University in 1894.

After graduation, he returned to Jacksonville, where he taught at Stanton, a school for African-American students (the public schools were segregated) that was the largest of all the schools in the city. In 1906, at the young age of 35, he was promoted to principal. In the segregated system, Johnson was paid less than half of what white colleagues earned. He improved black education by adding the ninth and tenth grades to the school, to extend the years of schooling. He later resigned from this job to pursue other goals.

While working as a teacher, Johnson also read the law to prepare for the bar. In 1897, he was the first African American admitted to the Florida Bar Exam since the Reconstruction era ended. He was also the first black in Duval County to seek admission to the state bar. In order to be accepted, Johnson had a two-hour oral examination before three attorneys and a judge. He later recalled that one of the examiners, not wanting to see a black man admitted, left the room. Johnson drew on his law background especially during his years as a civil rights activist and leading the NAACP.

In 1930, at the age of 59, Johnson returned to education after his many years leading the NAACP. He accepted the Spence Chair of Creative Literature at Fisk University in Nashville, Tennessee. The university created the position for him in recognition of his achievements as a poet, editor and critic during the Harlem Renaissance. In addition to discussing literature, he lectured on a wide range of issues related to the lives and civil rights of black Americans. He held this position until his death. In 1934, he also was appointed as the first African-American professor at New York University, where he taught several classes in literature and culture.

Music

As noted above, in 1901 Johnson had moved to New York City with his brother J. Rosamond Johnson to work in musical theater. They collaborated on such hits as "Tell Me, Dusky Maiden", "Nobody's Looking but the Owl and the Moon," and the spiritual "Dem Bones", for which Johnson wrote the lyrics and his brother the music. Johnson composed a poem which was later set to music to become "Lift Ev'ry Voice and Sing" to honor renowned educator Booker T. Washington who was visiting Stanton School, when the poem was recited by 500 school children as a tribute to Abraham Lincoln's birthday. This song became widely popular and has become known as the "Negro National Anthem," a title that the NAACP adopted and promoted.  The song included the following lines:

Lift ev'ry voice and sing, 'Til earth and heaven ring,Ring with the harmonies of liberty;Let our rejoicing rise, high as the list'ning skies,Let it resound loud as the rolling sea.Sing a song full of faith that the dark past has taught us,Sing a song full of the hope that the present has brought us;Facing the rising sun of our new day begun,Let us march on 'til victory is won.

"Lift Ev'ry Voice and Sing" had influenced other artistic works, inspiring art such as Gwendolyn Ann Magee's quilted mosaics.  "Lift Ev'ry Voice and Sing" contrasted with W.E.B. Du Bois's exploration in Souls of Black Folk of the fears of post-emancipation generations of African Americans.

After some successes, the brothers worked on Broadway and collaborated with producer and director Bob Cole. Johnson also collaborated on the opera Tolosa with his brother, who wrote the music; it satirized the U.S. annexation of the Pacific islands. Thanks to his success as a Broadway songwriter, Johnson moved in the upper echelons of African-American society in Manhattan and Brooklyn.

Diplomacy
In 1906, Johnson was appointed by the Roosevelt Administration as consul of Puerto Cabello, Venezuela. In 1909, he transferred to Corinto, Nicaragua. During his stay at Corinto, a rebellion erupted against President Adolfo Diaz. Johnson proved an effective diplomat in such times of strain.

His positions also provided time and stimulation to pursue his literary career. He wrote substantial portions of his novel, The Autobiography of an Ex-Colored Man, and his poetry collection, Fifty Years, during this period. His poetry was published in major journals such as The Century Magazine and in The Independent.

Literary writing
Johnson's first success as a writer was the poem "Lift Ev'ry Voice and Sing" (1899), which his brother Rosamond later set to music; the song became unofficially known as the "Negro National Anthem." During his time in the diplomatic service, Johnson completed what became his best-known book, The Autobiography of an Ex-Colored Man, which he published anonymously in 1912. He chose anonymity to avoid any controversy that might endanger his diplomatic career.  It was not until 1927 that Johnson acknowledged writing the novel, stressing that it was not a work of autobiography but mostly fictional.

In this period, he also published his first poetry collection, Fifty Years and Other Poems (1917). It showed his increasing politicization and adoption of the black vernacular influences that characterize his later work.

Johnson returned to New York, where he was involved in the Harlem Renaissance of the 1920s. He had a broad appreciation for black artists, musicians and writers, and worked to heighten awareness in the wider society of their creativity. In 1922, he published a landmark anthology The Book of American Negro Poetry, with a "Preface" that celebrated the power of black expressive culture. He compiled and edited the anthology The Book of American Negro Spirituals, which was published in 1925.

He continued to publish his own poetry as well. Johnson's collection God's Trombones: Seven Negro Sermons in Verse (1927) is considered most important. He demonstrated that black folk life could be the material of serious poetry. He also comments on the violence of racism in poems such as "Fragment," which portrays slavery as against both God's love and God's law.

Following the flourishing of the Harlem Renaissance in the 1920s, Johnson reissued his anthology of poetry by black writers, The Book of American Negro Poetry, in 1931, including many new poets. This established the African-American poetic tradition for a much wider audience and also inspired younger poets.

In 1930, he published a sociological study, Black Manhattan (1930). His Negro Americans, What Now? (1934) was a book-length address advocating fuller civil rights for African Americans. By this time, tens of thousands of African Americans had left the South for Northern and Midwestern cities in the Great Migration, but the majority still lived in the South. There they were politically disenfranchised and subject to Jim Crow laws and white supremacy. Outside the South, many faced discrimination but had more political rights and chances for education and work.

Film

At least one of Mr. Johnson's works was credited as leading to a movie. Go Down, Death! was a Harlemwood Studios production, directed by Spencer Williams. In the film credits, it states, "Alfred N. Sack Reverently Presents...." (the film), with hymns playing in the background.  The film opens:

 "Forward: This Story of Love and Simple Faith and Triumph of Good Over Evil was inspired by the Poem "GO DOWN, DEATH!" from the Pen of the Celebrated Negro Author James Weldon Johnson, Now of Sainted Memory."

The film featured an all African-American cast, including Myra D. Hemings, Samuel H. James, Eddie L. Houston, Spencer Williams and Amos Droughan, among others. It also included a dancing and band sequence, depicting a fun-looking, middle-class oriented club with drinks and gambling, as its opening backdrop.

Death
Johnson died in 1938 while vacationing in Wiscasset, Maine, when the car his wife was driving was hit by a train. His funeral in Harlem was attended by more than 1,000 people. Johnson's ashes are interred at Green-Wood Cemetery in Brooklyn, New York.

Legacy and honors
 1904: Honorary master's degree from Atlanta University.
 1925: Spingarn Medal from the NAACP for outstanding achievement by an American Negro.
 1928: Harmon Gold Award for God's Trombones: Seven Negro Sermons in Verse (1927).
 1929: Julius Rosenwald Fund Grant.
 1933: W. E. B. Du Bois Prize for Negro Literature.
 Honorary doctorates from Talladega College (1917) and Howard University (1923).
 2007: Emory University in Atlanta established the James Weldon Johnson Institute for Advanced Interdisciplinary Studies in his honor, later renamed the James Weldon Johnson Institute for the Study of Race and Difference.
 The James Weldon Johnson building at Coppin State University in Baltimore, Maryland, is named in his honor.
 The James Weldon Johnson Middle School in Jacksonville, Florida, the city of his birth, is named in his honor.
 The James Weldon Johnson Community Library in St. Petersburg, Florida, is named in his honor and to commemorate his birth in nearby Jacksonville.
 On February 2, 1988, the United States Postal Service issued a 22-cent postage stamp in his honor.
 On August 11, 2020, the Jacksonville, Florida City Council renamed Hemming Park to James Weldon Johnson Park.
 In 2021, the Maine Legislature designated June 17 James Weldon Johnson Annual Observance Day. The bill also created a task force of civil society organizations and Wiscasset residents to "develop methods to educate the public on James Weldon Johnson’s life and legacy in order to continue his work to end systemic racism."

Books

Poetry
 Fifty Years and Other Poems (1917)
 God's Trombones: Seven Negro Sermons in Verse (1927)
 Saint Peter Relates an Incident: Selected Poems (1935)

Anthologies
 The Book of American Negro Poetry (1922, editor), anthology (Link via HathiTrust)
 The Book of Negro Spirituals (1925, editor), anthology
 The Second Book of Negro Spirituals (1926, editor)

Other works
 The Autobiography of an Ex-Colored Man (1912/1927, novel)
 Black Manhattan (1930, study)
 Negro Americans, What Now? (1934, essay)

See also

 African American musical theater
 Harlem Renaissance
 Red Summer of 1919
 List of first minority male lawyers and judges in Florida

References

Bibliography
 Fleming, Robert E. James Weldon Johnson. Twayne United States Authors Series. Boston: Twayne, 1987.
 Hester, Elizabeth J. "James Weldon Johnson: A Bibliography of Dissertations and Theses 1939–2009."
 Johnson, James Weldon. Writings. Ed. William L. Andrews. The Library of America, 2004.
 
 Levy, Eugene. James Weldon Johnson: Black Leader, Black Voice. Chicago: University of Chicago Press, 1973.
 Morrissette, Noelle. James Weldon Johnson's Modern Soundscapes. Iowa City: University of Iowa Press, 2013.
 Price, Kenneth M., and Lawrence J. Oliver. Critical Essays on James Weldon Johnson. New York: G. K. Hall, 1997.
 Manning, Patrick.  The African Diaspora: A History Through Culture.  New York: Columbia University Press, 2010.

External links

Digital collections
 
 
 
 
 

Physical collections
 Images and archive  at the Smithsonian Institution.
 James Weldon Johnson and Grace Nail Johnson Papers. Yale Collection of American Literature, Beinecke Rare Book and Manuscript Library
 Profile, images, texts At University of South Carolina. University Libraries rare books and special collections.
 Stuart A. Rose Manuscript, Archives, and Rare Book Library, Emory University: James Weldon Johnson collection, circa 1886–1980

Other links
 Grace and James Weldon Johnson Website 
 Profile at Modern American Poets
 James Weldon Johnson: Profile and Poems at Poets.org
 Profile at Poetry Foundation
  (online audio from recordings made by W. Cabell Greet and George W. Hibbitt)
 His life is retold in the radio drama "Poet in Pine Mill", a presentation from Destination Freedom

1871 births
1938 deaths
African-American composers
African-American male composers
20th-century American novelists
African-American poets
African-American novelists
African-American educators
American memoirists
American male novelists
American male poets
American people of Bahamian descent
American people of French descent
American people of Haitian descent
Burials at Green-Wood Cemetery
Clark Atlanta University alumni
Columbia University alumni
Fisk University alumni
Fisk University faculty
Florida Republicans
Harlem Renaissance
History of Jacksonville, Florida
New York (state) Republicans
Writers from Jacksonville, Florida
Road incident deaths in Maine
Steinhardt School of Culture, Education, and Human Development faculty
Tennessee Republicans
Spingarn Medal winners
African-American non-fiction writers
American non-fiction writers
20th-century American poets
19th-century American poets
African-American diplomats
American diplomats
American anti-lynching activists
19th-century male writers
20th-century American male writers
Novelists from Florida
Novelists from New York (state)
Novelists from Tennessee
American male non-fiction writers
NAACP activists
African-American history in Jacksonville, Florida
20th-century African-American writers